List of hospitals in Massachusetts (U.S. state), sorted by location.  Unless otherwise noted, these hospitals are full-service, complete with emergency department.

Amesbury, Essex County
 Amesbury Health Center

Athol, Worcester County
 Athol Hospital

Attleboro, Bristol County
 Sturdy Memorial Hospital
 Arbour-Fuller Hospital (Psychiatric) (South Attleboro)

Ayer, Middlesex County
 Nashoba Valley Medical Center

Barnstable County
 Barnstable County Hospital (Tuberculosis/Public Health) (Closed 1995)

Bedford, Middlesex County
 Bedford Veterans Affairs Medical Center

Belmont, Middlesex County
 McLean Hospital (Psychiatric)

Beverly, Essex County
 Beverly Hospital

Boston, Suffolk County
 Arbour Hospital (Psychiatric)
 Boston Emergency and General Hospital (1891–1912)
 Boston Medical Center
 Carney Hospital, Dorchester
 Faulkner Hospital (Now Brigham and Women's Faulkner Hospital)
 Floating Hospital for Children(closed)Now tufts children"s hospital(also closed)
 Franciscan Hospital for Children
 Hebrew Rehabilitation Center for the Aged
 Lemuel Shattuck Hospital (Public Health/DMH/Prison Hospital)
 Lindemann Mental Health Center
 Massachusetts Eye and Ear Infirmary
 Massachusetts General Hospital for Children
 Massachusetts General Hospital
 Massachusetts Mental Health Center (formerly Boston Psychopathic Hospital, closed in 2010)
 Mattapan Community Health Center
 New England Baptist Hospital – Mostly orthopedic (The Hospital for Orthopedics)
 DR. Solomon Carter Fuller Mental Health Center
 St. Elizabeth's Medical Center (Boston)
 St. John of God Hospital (closed in 2000; was a specialty hospital run by Caritas)
 St. Margaret's Center for Women & Infants (Part of St. Elizabeth's) – in Brighton, MA
 Shriner's Hospital – Burns Institute
 Spaulding Rehabilitation Hospital
 The Boston Center (Children's partial hospital program)
 Tufts Medical Center
 VA Hospital Jamaica Plain – Veterans Health Administration
 VA Hospital West Roxbury – Veterans Health Administration
 In the Longwood Medical and Academic Area:
 Beth Israel Deaconess Medical Center
 Boston Children's Hospital
 Brigham and Women's Hospital
 Dana–Farber Cancer Institute
 Dana-Farber/Boston Children's Cancer and Blood Disorders Center
 Joslin Diabetes Center

Braintree, Norfolk County
 Braintree Rehabilitation HospitalNow *Encompass Health Rehabilitation Hospital of Braintree

Bridgewater, Plymouth County
 Bridgewater State Hospital (Criminally Insane Psychiatric)

Bristol County
 Bristol County Tuberculosis Hospital (defunct)

Brockton, Plymouth County
 Good Samaritan Medical Center
 Signature Healthcare Brockton Hospital
 VA Medical Center Brockton – Veterans Health Administration

Brookline, Norfolk County
 Arbour HRI (Psychiatric)
 Bournewood Hospital (Psychiatric)
 Free Hospital for Women (defunct)

Burlington, Middlesex County
 Lahey Hospital & Medical Center

Cambridge, Middlesex County
 Cambridge Hospital – Cambridge Health Alliance
 Homberg Infirmary
 Mount Auburn Hospital
 Stillman Infirmary – Harvard University
 Spaulding Hospital Cambridge – formerly Youville Hospital and Rehabilitation Hospital

Canton, Norfolk County
 Pappas Rehabilitation Hospital for Children - formerly Massachusetts Hospital School

Chelsea, Suffolk County
 L.F. Quigley Memorial Hospital (Part of Chelsea Soldier's Home)
 Chelsea Soldier's Home (Owned and operated by Commonwealth of MA)
 Massachusetts General Hospital new satellite health center for Massachusetts General Hospital
 Chelsea Memorial Hospital closed 1996, satellite health center for Massachusetts General Hospital
 Chelsea Naval Hospital closed 1974, converted to condominiums
 Chelsea Marine Hospital closed 1940, converted to Navy housing later converted to condominiums

Clinton, Worcester County
 Clinton Hospital

Concord, Middlesex County
 Emerson Hospital

Danvers, Essex County
 Hunt Center
 Massachusetts General Hospital a.k.a. MGH North satellite health center
 Danvers State Hospital (demolished)
New England Rehab Hospital At Danvers

Devens, Middlesex and Worcester Counties
 Lovell General Hospital (demolished)
 Cutler Army Community Hospital (converted, now Federal Medical Center, Devens)
Taravista Behavioral hospital

East Sandwich, Sandwich, Barnstable County
 Rehabilitation Hospital of the Cape and Islands

Everett, Middlesex County
 CHA Everett Hospital – Cambridge Health Alliance

Fall River, Bristol County
 Charlton Memorial Hospital, part of the Southcoast Health System
 Dr. John C. Corrigan Mental Health Center
 St. Anne's Hospital
 Truesdale Hospital

Falmouth, Barnstable County
 Falmouth Hospital
 Otis Air Force Base Hospital (closed)

Fitchburg, Worcester County
 Burbank Hospital (urgent care only)

Foxborough, Norfolk County
 Brigham and Women's / Mass General Health Care Center

Framingham, Middlesex County
 MetroWest Medical Center (Framingham Union portion)

Gardner, Worcester County
 Heywood Memorial Hospital
 Gardner State Hospital (Used to be a reformatory?, now a state prison)

Georgetown, Essex County
 Baldpate Hospital (Psychiatric)

Gloucester, Essex County
 Addison Gilbert Hospital

Great Barrington, Berkshire County
 Fairview Hospital (Massachusetts)

Greenfield, Franklin County
 Franklin Medical Center

Haverhill, Essex County
 Holy Family at Merrimack Valley Hospital (formerly Hale Hospital)
 The Whittier Pavilion Hospital (Psych)

Holyoke, Hampden County
 Holyoke Medical Center
 Providence Behavioral Health Hospital
 State Medical Examiner's Office for Western MA
 Soldiers' Home in Holyoke
MiraVista Behavioral Health Center

Hyannis, Barnstable, Barnstable County
 Cape Cod Hospital

Lakeville, Plymouth County
 Lakeville State Hospital (closed)

Lawrence, Essex County
 Lawrence General Hospital

Leominster, Worcester County
 HealthAlliance Hospital

Lowell, Middlesex County
 Lowell General Hospital
 Saints Medical Center (now Lowell General Hospital – Saints Campus)
 Lowell Treatment Center(closed)
New England Rehab Hospital At Lowell

Ludlow, Hampden County
 HealthSouth Rehabilitation Hospital of Western Massachusetts(Now Encompass Health Rehabilitation Hospital of Western Massachusetts)

Lynn, Essex County
 BayRidge Hospital (Psych)
 Union Hospital – North Shore Medical Center

Malden, Middlesex County
 Hallmark Health System

Marlborough, Middlesex County
 Marlborough Hospital

Medfield, Norfolk County
 Medfield State Hospital (closed in 2005)

Medford, Middlesex County
 Lawrence Memorial Hospital - Wellforce

Melrose, Middlesex County
 MelroseWakefield Hospital - Wellforce

Methuen, Essex County
 Holy Family Hospital and Medical Center

Middleborough, Plymouth County
 High Point Hospital
 St. Luke's Hospital, formerly Cranberry Specialty Hospital. Closed 2007 – see Southcoast Health System
 McLean Southeast (Psychiatric Hospital)

Milford, Worcester County
 Milford Regional Medical Center

Milton, Norfolk County
 Milton Hospital – now Beth Israel Deaconess Hospital-Milton

Nantucket
 Nantucket Cottage Hospital

Natick, Middlesex County
 Metrowest Medical Center (Leonard Morse Hospital - Emergency Department closed as of 10/25/2020)

Needham, Norfolk County
 Beth Israel Deaconess Medical Center – Needham satellite campus

New Bedford, Bristol County
 Charron Maternity Hospital (closed)
 St. Luke's Hospital, part of the Southcoast Health System
 Parkwood Hospital, formerly Union Hospital, now Vibra Hospital of Southeastern Massachusetts, part of Vibra Healthcare
 High Point Treatment Center
 Mediplex Rehabilitation Hospital

Newburyport, Essex County
 Anna Jaques Hospital

Newton, Middlesex County
 Newton-Wellesley Hospital

Norfolk, Norfolk County
 Southwood Community Hospital, a.k.a. Pinewood, Norfolk (closed), formerly Pondville State (Cancer/DPH) Hospital in the 1970s.

North Adams, Berkshire County
 North Adams Regional Hospital(Closed) ED opened as Berkshire Medical Center-Satellite

Northampton, Hampshire County
 Cooley Dickinson Hospital  – a Massachusetts General Hospital affiliate.
 Northampton Veterans Affairs Medical Center – Veterans Health Administration

Norwood, Norfolk County
 Norwood Hospital

Oak Bluffs, Dukes County
 Martha's Vineyard Hospital

Palmer, Hampden County
 Baystate Wing Hospital

Peabody, Essex County
 Boston Children's North
 Lahey Clinic – North Shore (a.k.a. Lahey North)

Pembroke, Plymouth County
 Pembroke Hospital (Psychiatric)

Petersham, Worcester County
 The Quabbin Retreat (Behavioral health and substance abuse services, part of Heywood Healthcare)

Pittsfield, Berkshire County
 Berkshire Medical Center

Plymouth, Plymouth County
 High Point Treatment
 Jordan Hospital – Now Beth Israel Deaconess Hospital-Plymouth

Pocasset, Bourne, Barnstable County
 Barnstable County Hospital (demolished)
 Pocasset Mental Health Center(Cape Cod & Island Community Mental Health Center )

Quincy, Norfolk County
 Quincy Medical Center – Steward Health Care. Closed December 2014, except for 24hr ER Emergency Services
 Quincy Mental Health Center

Revere, Suffolk County
 Massachusetts General Hospital satellite health center

Salem, Essex County
 Salem Hospital

Saugus, Essex County
 Saugus General Hospital (1946–1978)

Somerville, Middlesex County
 Somerville Hospital – Cambridge Health Alliance (no emergency department as of 30 April 2020)

Southbridge, Worcester County
 Harrington Memorial Hospital

Springfield, Hampden County
 Baystate Children's Hospital
 Baystate Medical Center
 Mercy Medical Center
 Kindred Park View Specialty Hospital of Springfield – formerly Springfield Municipal Hospital
Shriners Hospitals for Children

Stockbridge, Berkshire County
 Austen Riggs Center (Psychiatric)

Stoneham, Middlesex County
 Boston Regional Medical Center (closed in 1999, now mostly MD offices)

Stoughton, Norfolk County
 New England Sinai Hospital
 Curahealth Hospital – Stoughton

Taunton, Bristol County
 Morton Hospital and Medical Center
 Taunton State Hospital (still in operation, but partially closed)

Tewksbury, Middlesex County
 Tewksbury State Hospital (psychiatric/public health)

Waltham, Middlesex County
 Boston Children's at Waltham (formerly Waltham/Weston Hospital, then became Deaconess Waltham Hospital, then Sterling Medical Center)
 Massachusetts General Hospital satellite health center ("Mass General West")
 Metropolitan State Hospital (demolished)
 Murphy Army Hospital (Closed) (Site now a school)
 Olympus Specialty Hospital - formerly Middlesex County Hospital (demolished)
 Walden Behavior Care

Ware, Hampshire County
 Baystate Mary Lane Hospital

Wareham, Plymouth County
 Tobey Hospital, part of the Southcoast Health System

Webster, Worcester County
 Hubbard Regional Hospital – Facilities now occupied by Harrington Memorial Hospital (Southbridge, MA). Emergency department, sleep Lab, imaging services, lab, ambulatory surgery are open; TCU (private) also open. All inpatient beds are closed, effective May 2009.

Wellesley, Norfolk County
 Charles River Hospital (Psychiatric hospital was closed, torn down in 2002, redeveloped into houses)

Westborough, Worcester County
 Westborough State Hospital – closed in 2010
 Whitter Rehabilitation Hospital
 Westborough Behavioral Healthcare Hospital
New England Recovery Center

Westfield, Hampden County 
 Baystate Noble Hospital
 Western Massachusetts Hospital (Public Health – Massachusetts Department of Public Health)

Westwood, Norfolk County 
 Westwood Lodge Hospital (Psychiatric) (Closed)

Weymouth, Norfolk County 
 South Shore Hospital

Winchester, Middlesex County 
 Winchester Hospital

Woburn, Middlesex County 
 Encompass Health Rehabilitation Hospital of New England (formerly New England Rehabilitation Hospital)
 Choate Memorial Hospital (opened 1909, closed 1989, now a medical center and an assisted living)

Worcester, Worcester County 
 Adcare Hospital (formerly Doctor's Hospital, established in 1984)
 Fairlawn Rehabilitation Hospital
 Hahnemann Hospital
 Jewish Healthcare Center
 Memorial Hospital
 Saint Vincent Hospital
 UMass Memorial Health Care
UMass Memorial medical center-university campus
UMass Memorial Medical center-memorial campus
 UMass Memorial medical center-hahnemann campus
UMass Childrens Hospital
 Worcester City Hospital (Closed)
 Worcester Recovery Center and Hospital
 Worcester State Hospital (Closed)

References

External links 
 Massachusetts hospitals – Massachusetts Hospital Association
 . (Various documents).

Massachusetts
 
Hospitals